"Who Shot Sam" is a song by George Jones. It was recorded and released as a single in 1959 by Mercury Records and reached No. 7 on the country singles chart. Jones wrote the song with Darrell Edwards, with whom he had collaborated on several occasions, and Ray Jackson. The song is very similar to "White Lightning". Like "White Lightning", "Who Shot Sam" appeared on the low rungs of the pop chart, peaking at No. 93. The song tells the story about a wild Saturday-night shoot-out in New Orleans, Louisiana.

Discography

1959 songs
Songs written by George Jones
George Jones songs
Mercury Records singles
Song recordings produced by Pappy Daily